Alikovo’s Church of the Assumption of the Virgin is an orthodox church of the Cheboksary-Chuvash diocese (the Moscow patriarchy), located in village Alikovo of the Alikovsky District of the Chuvash Republic (Russian Federation).

History
In Alikovsky volost of Yadrinsky District 34 villages were registered. Lived in them 7900 showers: 3917 male, to 3983 female. In 1782 on donations of parishioners have opened Church of the Assumption of the Virgin. The quantity of parish settlements was 18: Seener, Togach, Azamat, Yangoras, Videsjuch, Urmaevo, Izvanka, Ilgishovo, Ojkasy, Korakkasy, Tautovo, Hodjakovo, Khirlepposi, Toropkasy, Pavlushkino, Jargunkino, the Attic, Horavary. In arrival 1047 courtyard at that time were considered, men was 3007, women 2968.

Church of the Assumption of the Virgin in Alikovo has been based in August, 1744. Then it was a wooden building in the settlement Alikovo center. After opening of church tsarina Vseja of Russia Elizabeth Petrovna has sent новостроенному to a temple the thankful book with the following signature 
«Сия книга изготовлена типографией и по приказу преосвященного Дмитрия Епископа Нижегородского палатою отдана безденежно декабря 3 дня 1747 года, в Курмышском уезде новокрещенного села Успенское, Аликово тож новостроенного у новокрещенных церкви»

In 1755 for Alikovsky church from Yadrin have brought 2 bells in weight on 10 pods.

From historical documents is known that priests serving in 1774 have been killed by participants of country revolt of Emelyne Pugachev.

And in 1782 for parishioners of Alikovsky arrival the new wooden building of church has been constructed. And in 1901 on means of parishioners again the wooden building of church is under construction. In church two holy tables: the Assumption of Divine Mother and St. John Bogoslov.

In the beginning of 1930 in Russia start to close temples ruthlessly. In 1936 during strong hurricane all top part of church together with bells has fallen to the ground. After repair in a church building have opened regional Recreation center.

In 1991 on an insisting of parishioners of village Alikovo and neighboring settlements in August of this year church divine services have renewed in a house of worship. Now building of a new temple is conducted.

The building of orthodox church which will decorate in the near future village, is under construction the whole world. The feasible financial help is rendered by rural settlements, schools, the various organizations, parishioners and simple inhabitants, and not only Alikovsky area [2].

Church-parish school
The church-parish school has sat down Alikovo is opened in 1845 («the summary record about a condition of church-parish schools and schools of the reading and writing of the Kazan province) [3]. This school worked in village Norusovo,« village nowadays Narusovo of Vurnarsky area CHR» earlier. In 1854 the given school is transported in village Alikovo and renamed into «Church-parish school of village Alikovo of Yadrinsky District of the Kazan province».

See also
Church of Christmas of the Virgin (Raskildino)

External links
 Official site
 Orthodox Chuvashs celebrate a holiday of the Assumption of the Virgin
 Orthodox Chuvashs celebrate a holiday of the Assumption of the Virgin
 Orthodox Chuvashs celebrate a holiday of the Assumption of the Virgin
 Alikovo's Church of the Assumption of the Virgin
 Church of the Assumption of the Virgin

18th-century Eastern Orthodox church buildings
Russian Orthodox church buildings in Russia
Churches in Chuvashia
18th-century churches in Russia